Oocatochus is a genus of snake in the family Colubridae  that contains the sole species Oocatochus rufodorsatus. It is known as the  Chinese garter snake, frog-eating rat snake, or red-backed  rat snake.

It is found in East Asia, in eastern China, Korea, and Russia. The Reptile Database also mentions Taiwan, but other sources do not support this.

References 

Colubrids
Monotypic snake genera
Snakes of Asia
Reptiles of China
Reptiles of Russia
Reptiles of Korea
Taxa named by Theodore Edward Cantor
Reptiles described in 1842